Nightlife is the third EP by American electronic rock band Phantogram, released November 1, 2011 by Barsuk Records. It was also sold at their shows before the official release date. The first single from the album, "Don't Move", was debuted October 5, 2011 by Pitchfork. They released the album for full streaming on their Facebook page on October 18.

Track listing 
 "16 Years" – 3:56
 "Don't Move" – 4:18
 "Turning Into Stone" – 4:54
 "Make a Fist" – 4:36
 "Nightlife" – 4:06
 "A Dark Tunnel" – 5:29

References 

Electronic rock EPs
Indie pop EPs
Barsuk Records EPs
2011 EPs
Phantogram (band) albums